James Adam may refer to:

James Adam (architect) (1732–1794), Scottish architect
James N. Adam (1842–1912), American politician
James Adam (classicist) (1860–1907), Scottish classicist
James Adam (emigration agent) (1822–1908), New Zealand local politician for Otago Provincial Council
James Adam, Lord Adam (1824–1914), Scottish judge
Jimmy Adam (born 1931), Scottish footballer

See also
James Adams (disambiguation)